The 2022 IIHF U18 World Championship Division I were a pair of international under-18 ice hockey tournaments organised by the International Ice Hockey Federation. The Division I A and Division I B tournaments represented the second and the third tier of the IIHF World U18 Championship.

Division I A

The Division I A tournament was played in Piešťany, Slovakia, from 11 to 17 April 2022.

Participants

Standings

Results
All times are local (UTC+2).

Division I B

The Division I B tournament was played in Asiago, Italy, from 25 April to 1 May 2022.

Participants

Standings

Results
All times are local (UTC+2).

References

IIHF World U18 Championship Division I
2022 IIHF World U18 Championships
International ice hockey competitions hosted by Slovakia
International ice hockey competitions hosted by Italy
2021–22 in Slovak ice hockey
2021–22 in Italian ice hockey
IIHF
IIHF
IIHF